HMS Peterhead was a  built for the Royal Navy during the Second World War.

Design and description
The Bangor class was designed as a small minesweeper that could be easily built in large numbers by civilian shipyards; as steam turbines were difficult to manufacture, the ships were designed to accept a wide variety of engines. The ship's complement consisted of 60 officers and ratings.

She was powered by two vertical triple-expansion steam engines (VTE), each driving one shaft, using steam provided by two Admiralty three-drum boilers.

The VTE-powered Bangors were armed with a 12-pounder  anti-aircraft gun and a single QF 2-pounder (4 cm) AA gun or a quadruple mount for the Vickers .50 machine gun. In some ships the 2-pounder was replaced a single or twin  20 mm Oerlikon AA gun, while most ships were fitted with four additional single Oerlikon mounts over the course of the war. For escort work, their minesweeping gear could be exchanged for around 40 depth charges.

Construction and career

She was built by Blyth Shipbuilding Company, of Blyth, Northumberland and launched on 31 October 1940. So far she has been the only ship of the Royal Navy named after the Scottish town of Peterhead. Under the command of Lt Cdr David Croom-Johnson RNVR (later Lord Justice Croom-Johnson), she took part in Operation Neptune, the assault phase of the invasion of Normandy and was mined off Utah Beach on 8 June 1944. Croom-Johnson was awarded a Distinguished Service Cross for Peterhead’s work in Operation Neptune. Peterhead was declared a total loss, and was sold for scrapping on 1 January 1948.  She was broken up at Hayes, of Pembroke in May 1948.

References

Bibliography

External links
 HMS Peterhead at uboat.net
 Daily Telegraph Obituary for Sir David Croom-Johnson

 

Bangor-class minesweepers of the Royal Navy
Ships built on the River Blyth
1940 ships
World War II minesweepers of the United Kingdom